The 2015 ITM 500 Auckland was a motor race meeting for the Australian sedan-based V8 Supercars. It was the twelfth event of the 2015 International V8 Supercars Championship. It was held on the weekend of 6–8 November at the Pukekohe Park Raceway, near Pukekohe, New Zealand.

Race results

Race 28

Qualifying

Race 

Notes
 – Scott Pye was demoted behind Craig Lowndes after officials deemed him to have gained an advantage by using the escape road at turn five and missing out the chicane.

Race 29

Qualifying

Race

Race 30

Qualifying

Race

References 

ITM 500 Auckland
November 2015 sports events in New Zealand
2015 in New Zealand motorsport